Stemmocryptidae is a very small family of bugs in the order Hemiptera, known from Papua New Guinea. There is only one species in one genus, Stemmocrypta antennata.

References

Dipsocoromorpha
Heteroptera families
Monogeneric insect families